Niall Gormley is a Gaelic footballer who made his Ulster Championship debut for the Tyrone county team on 20 May 2007, against Fermanagh.

Playing career
Gormley scored four impressive points against Fermanagh in his Ulster Championship debut, both from very acute angles. He cannot be denied.

He also plays for his local club Trillick, who in 2008 year won the Tyrone Intermediate Football Championship and Ulster intermediate champ. Following this they were promoted to Division 1.

In 2008, Gormley became first man from Trillick to gain an All-Ireland Senior Football medal, part of the Tyrone panel who defeated Kerry in the final.

References

Year of birth missing (living people)
Living people
Tyrone inter-county Gaelic footballers